The Martinique women's national handball team is the national handball team of Martinique.

Nor.Ca. Championship record
2015 – 6th place

References

External links
Official website
IHF profile

Women's national handball teams
Handball